Poniatowski (masculine; feminine: Poniatowska; plural: Poniatowscy) is a Polish surname. It may also be transliterated via Russian language (due to parts of  Poland being annexed to the Russian Empire) as Ponyatovsky, Ponyatovskiy or Ponyatovski (feminine: Ponyatovskaya). 

Notable people with this surname include members of the Polish noble Poniatowski family and other people:
 Andrzej Poniatowski (1735–1773), Polish nobleman and military commander
 Axel Poniatowski (born 1951), French politician
Bernard Poniatowski (born 1939), Canadian politician
Bogdan Poniatowski (1931–2014), Polish rower
Dionizy Poniatowski (1750–1811), Polish military commander
 Elena Poniatowska (born 1932), Mexican journalist, author and professor
 Izabella Poniatowska (1730–1801), Polish noblewoman, sister of Stanisław August
 Józef Poniatowski (1763–1813), Polish military commander, Marshal of the French Empire
 Józef Michał Poniatowski (1814–1873), Polish composer and an operatic tenor
Józef Stanisław Poniatowski (1835–1908), Polish nobleman, son of Jozef Michal
 Kazimierz Poniatowski (1721–1800), Polish nobility and military commander
 Konstancja Poniatowska (1759–1830), Polish noblewoman, niece of Stanisław August
 Ladislas Poniatowski (born 1946), French politician
 Ludwika Maria Poniatowska (1728–1781), Polish noblewoman, sister of Stanisław August
Maria Teresa Poniatowska (1760–1834), Polish noblewoman, niece of Stanisław August
 Michał Jerzy Poniatowski (1736–1794), Polish nobleman
 Michel Poniatowski (1922–2002), French politician
 Stanisław Poniatowski (1676–1762), Polish military commander, diplomat, and noble
 Stanisław Poniatowski (1754–1833), Polish nobleman, politician and diplomat
 Stanisław August Poniatowski (1732–1798), King of Poland, brother of Izabella and Ludwika 

Polish-language surnames